Granville Ryder may refer to:

Granville Ryder (1799–1879), British politician
Granville Ryder (1833–1901), British politician, son of the above